Horisme is a genus of moths in the family Geometridae. The genus was described by Jacob Hübner in 1825.

Species

 Horisme aemulata (Hübner, 1813)
 Horisme albifascia Herbulot, 1997
 Horisme albiplaga Herbulot, 1988
 Horisme albostriata (Pagenstecher, 1907)
 Horisme alticameruna Herbulot, 1988
 Horisme aquata (Hübner, 1813)
 Horisme calligraphata (Herrich-Schäffer, 1839)
 Horisme corticata (Treitschke, 1835)
 Horisme cuprea Herbulot, 1972
 Horisme disparata Herbulot, 1988
 Horisme exoletata (Herrich-Schäffer, 1838)
 Horisme falcata (Bang-Haas, 1907)
 Horisme filia L. B. Prout, 1913
 Horisme gillettei (Hulst, 1898)
 Horisme incana Swett, 1918
 Horisme incurvaria (Erschoff, 1877)
 Horisme intersecta (Staudinger, 1882)
 Horisme intestinata (Guenée, 1857)
 Horisme intricata (Staudinger, 1882)
 Horisme inturbida Herbulot, 1997
 Horisme jansei D. S. Fletcher, 1956
 Horisme longispicata D. S. Fletcher, 1956
 Horisme lucillata (Guenée, [1858])
 Horisme milvaria (Christoph, 1893)
 Horisme minuata (Walker, 1860)
 Horisme mortuata (Guenée, 1857)
 Horisme nigrovittata (Warren, 1888)
 Horisme obscurata L. B. Prout, 1913
 Horisme pallidimacula L. B. Prout, 1925
 Horisme parcata (Püngeler, 1909)
 Horisme plagiographa Turner, 1922
 Horisme predotai (Bytinski-Salz, 1937)
 Horisme punctiscripta (L. B. Prout, 1917)
 Horisme radicaria (La Harpe, 1855)
 Horisme rectilineata (Taylor, 1907)
 Horisme scorteata (Staudinger, 1901)
 Horisme scotosiata (Guenée, [1858])
 Horisme stratata (Wileman, 1911)
 Horisme tersata (Denis & Schiffermüller, 1775) – fern
 Horisme vitalbata (Denis & Schiffermüller, 1775) – small waved umber
 Horisme wittei Debauche, 1938
 Horisme xerophila Herbulot, 1988
 Horisme xylinata (Warren, 1906)

References
 
 
 

Melanthiini
Taxa named by Jacob Hübner